Viktor Sobolev (born 23 February 1950, Kalinino, Krasnodar Krai) is a Russian political and military figure, and a deputy of the 8th State Duma.
 
After graduating from the Baku Higher Combined Arms Command School, Sobolev was assigned to serve in Chernivtsi in the Carpathian Military District. In 1981, after graduating from the Frunze Military Academy, he served in the Far Eastern Military District. Later Sobolev was appointed the commander of the 129th Guards Rifle Division. In 2000, he was sent to the Siberian Military District as deputy commander of the 41st Combined Arms Army. In 2003, he headed the 58th Combined Arms Army. Three years later, Viktor Ivanovich received a new position as a chief military adviser in India. 
 
In 2011, he joined the Communist Party of the Russian Federation. Since September 2021, he has served as deputy of the 8th State Duma.

References
 

 

1950 births
Living people
Communist Party of the Russian Federation members
21st-century Russian politicians
Eighth convocation members of the State Duma (Russian Federation)
People from Krasnodar Krai